The Robber Symphony is a 1936 British musical film directed by Friedrich Feher.

Cast 
 Hans Feher as Giannino
 Magda Sonja as Giannino's mother
 George Graves as Giannino's grandfather
 Michael Martin Harvey as Man with straw hat
 Webster Booth as Singer
 Jack Tracy as Bassoon Player
 Oscar Asche as Chief Gendarme
 Alexandre Rignault as Black Devil
George André Martin as The Mayor

Reception
Writing for The Spectator in 1936, Graham Greene gave the film a mixed reception. Despite characterizing the picture as "certainly the most interesting film of the last twelve months", Greene found the film to deliver a "priggish[] reprimand [with] a didactic note". Praising the story as "excellent" and dwelling on the "superb sequence of four player-pianos dragged across the Alps", Greene nevertheless complained that "in so far as [Feher's] experiment is original, it is barren."

Trivia
The leading roles of Giannino and Giannino's mother were played by the director's son and wife.

References

External links 

1936 musical comedy films
British musical comedy films
1936 films
British black-and-white films
1930s English-language films
1930s British films